Cidaris rugosa is a species of sea urchins of the Family Cidaridae. Their armour is covered with spines. Cidaris rugosa was first described in 1907 by Hubert Lyman Clark as Dorocidaris rugosa.

References 

Animals described in 1907
Cidaridae